Kim Kyu-hwan (Hangul: 김규환, Hanja: 金奎歡, 16 July 1921 – 5 October 2007) was a South Korean football player who played for the South Korea in the 1948 Olympic. After retirement, He was appointed assistant manager in South Korea national football team in 1962

References

External links
 
South Korea at the 1948 Summer Olympics 

1921 births
2007 deaths
South Korean footballers
South Korea international footballers
Footballers at the 1948 Summer Olympics
Olympic footballers of South Korea
Association football midfielders
Pyongyang FC players